The 1994 Turkmenistan Higher League (Ýokary Liga) season was the third season of Turkmenistan's professional football league.

Final league table

References

Ýokary Liga seasons
Turk
Turk
1994 in Turkmenistani football